Tandara Alves Caixeta (born 30 October 1988) is a Brazilian professional volleyball player. She plays for the Brazil women's national volleyball team and for Sesc-Rio in the Brazilian Superliga. She competed for Brazil in the 2012 Summer Olympics, winning a gold medal. She is the daughter of Evaldo Caixeta, a former amateur player with Banco do Brasil Athletic Association. At the age of nine, after trying many different sports, she saw a TV advert and decided to go to a volleyball trial.

In 2011, she was selected for the Brazil team for the first time and won gold in the 2011 Pan American Games in Guadalajara before becoming an Olympic champion in London in 2012. She has twice been the top scorer in the Brazilian Women's Superliga. She is known for breaking records in the Brazilian Superliga. In the 2013/2014 season, she broke the record for most points in a match; she scored 37 points. In the 2017/2018 season, she broke her own record, scoring 39 points, as well as scoring 626 points in the season, which this also the highest mark in the country. Again in the 2019/2020 season, she broke her record, scoring an unbelievable 40 points in 4 sets, the highest mark in the history of volleyball on the Brazilian courts.

Caixeta won the 2017 South American Championship Most Valuable Player award. She later won the 2017 FIVB World Grand Champions Cup Best Opposite Spiker award.

During the 2020 Summer Olympics, she was provisionally suspended for doping ahead of Brazil's semi-final against South Korea. Brazil ultimately won the silver medal at the tournament, and though suspended, Caixeta was still listed as a medalist, pending the outcome of the doping investigation.

Clubs
  A.D. Brusque (2005–2007)
  Grêmio de Vôlei Osasco (2007–2008)
  E.C. Pinheiros (2008–2009)
  A.D. Brusque (2009–2010)
  Vôlei Futuro (2010–2011)
  Sollys Osasco (2011–2012)
  SESI-SP (2012–2013)
  Vôlei Amil Campinas (2013–2014)
  Praia Clube (2014–2015)
  Minas Tênis Clube (2015–2016)
  Nestle Osasco (2016-2018)
  Guangdong Evergrande (2018–2019)
  SESC Rio (2019-2020)
  Osasco/Audax (2020-2022)

Awards

Individuals
 2012–13 Brazilian Superliga – "Best Scorer" 
 2013–14 Brazilian Superliga – "Best Scorer"
 2013–14 Brazilian Superliga – "Best Server"
 2016–17 Brazilian Superliga – "Best Scorer"
 2016–17 Brazilian Superliga – "Best Server" 
 2017 South American Championship – "Most Valuable Player"
 2017 FIVB World Grand Champions Cup – "Best Opposite Spiker"
 2017–18 Brazilian Superliga – "Most Valuable Player"
 2017–18 Brazilian Superliga – "Best Scorer"
 2017–18 Brazilian Superliga – "Best Spiker"
 2018 FIVB Nations League – "Best Opposite Spiker"
 2021 FIVB Nations League – "Best Opposite Spiker"

Clubs
 2007–08 Brazilian Superliga –  Runner Up, with Molico Osasco
 2011–12 Brazilian Superliga –  Champion, with Sollys Nestlé
 2016–17 Brazilian Superliga –  Runner Up, with Vôlei Nestlé
2020–21 Brazilian Superliga –  Bronze medal, with Osasco Audax/São Cristovão Saúde

References

1988 births
Brazilian women's volleyball players
Living people
Olympic volleyball players of Brazil
Volleyball players at the 2012 Summer Olympics
Olympic gold medalists for Brazil
Olympic medalists in volleyball
Medalists at the 2012 Summer Olympics
Volleyball players at the 2011 Pan American Games
Pan American Games gold medalists for Brazil
Pan American Games medalists in volleyball
Opposite hitters
Outside hitters
Brazilian expatriate sportspeople in China
Expatriate volleyball players in China
Medalists at the 2011 Pan American Games
Volleyball players at the 2020 Summer Olympics
Medalists at the 2020 Summer Olympics
Olympic silver medalists for Brazil
Doping cases in volleyball
Sportspeople from Brasília